Strzelecki was the original terminus station on the Strzelecki railway line in Victoria, Australia. It closed on 22 November 1930, after a timber trestle bridge on the section of line between Triholm and Strzelecki developed a large sway every time a train passed over it. It was deemed uneconomical to rebuild it and the section was closed after being in operation for only eight years. After this closure the terminus station was Triholm.

Station facilities
Strzelecki was the only station on the line to be fitted with a 53' turntable. Gangers facilities at the station were the ganger's headquarters, tool shed and departmental residence. Goods facilities at the station included goods loading platform, goods shed and cattle and sheep yards. Motor gang trolleys were also kept at the station.

See also
Strzelecki (disambiguation)

References

Disused railway stations in Victoria (Australia)
Shire of Baw Baw